William Armistead Tyler (born December 25, 1979, in Nashville, Tennessee) is an American musician and guitarist who plays "cosmic country," folk, indie folk, and pop rock. His debut studio album, Behold the Spirit, was released on November 22, 2010. Adam Bednarik produced the album with Tyler on Tompkins Square Records. He has since released three additional solo albums.

Background
Tyler was born to Daniel E. "Dan" Tyler and Adele B. Tyler on December 25, 1979, in Nashville, Tennessee. His father is a noted songwriter in his own right who wrote "The Light in Your Eyes" by LeAnn Rimes, co-wrote "Baby's Got a New Baby" by S-K-O, and co-wrote "Modern Day Romance" by Nitty Gritty Dirt Band; in addition, both of his parents co-wrote "Bobbie Sue" by The Oak Ridge Boys. Tyler has a younger sister named Elise. William and Elise Tyler were the owners and founders of The Stone Fox in Nashville, Tennessee, which was a music restaurant/café/bar that opened on September 20, 2012 and held its final live show on January 31, 2016. William is a 1998 graduate and his sister Elise is a 2002 graduate of University School of Nashville.

Music
Before he became a solo artist, Tyler was a member of Lambchop and Silver Jews beginning in 1998. Tyler first joined Lambchop at the age of 19 because Kurt Wagner approached him about playing the organ in the band. However, it turned out that he got to play guitar because he admittedly said "I couldn't really play" the organ. Before releasing music under his own name, Tyler used The Paper Hats as working title for his solo music. In 2010, Tyler released a universally acclaimed album entitled Behold the Spirit, and in 2013 released another critically acclaimed album entitled Impossible Truth. This was followed by his third full length, Modern Country, which was hailed by Rolling Stone magazine as one of the "best country albums of 2016".

Producer 
In 2015 Tyler produced the debut album for Jake Xerxes Fussell. Tyler was also one of two co-producers on the track "Survivor" from Mary J. Blige's 2017 album Strength of A Woman.

Discography

EPs
New Vanitas (2020)
Understand (2021) (with Luke Schneider)

Notes

References

External links 
 

1979 births
American country guitarists
American folk guitarists
American male guitarists
Fingerstyle guitarists
Merge Records artists
Living people
Musicians from Nashville, Tennessee
Silver Jews members
Lambchop (band) members
Country musicians from Tennessee
21st-century American guitarists
21st-century American male musicians
Third Man Records artists